Udahamulla East Grama Niladhari Division is a  Grama Niladhari Division of the  Maharagama Divisional Secretariat  of Colombo District  of Western Province, Sri Lanka .  It has Grama Niladhari Division Code 525A.

Udahamulla East is a surrounded by the  Mirihana South, Madiwela, Mirihana North, Pragathipura, Udahamulla West and Thalapathpitiya  Grama Niladhari Divisions.

Demographics

Ethnicity 

The Udahamulla East Grama Niladhari Division has  a Sinhalese majority (95.4%) . In comparison, the Maharagama Divisional Secretariat (which contains the Udahamulla East Grama Niladhari Division) has  a Sinhalese majority (95.7%)

Religion 

The Udahamulla East Grama Niladhari Division has  a Buddhist majority (90.7%) . In comparison, the Maharagama Divisional Secretariat (which contains the Udahamulla East Grama Niladhari Division) has  a Buddhist majority (92.0%)

References 

Grama Niladhari Divisions of Maharagama Divisional Secretariat